Clubul Sportiv Municipal Târgu Mureș, commonly known as CSM Târgu Mureș, is a Romanian basketball club based in Târgu Mureș, which currently participates in the Liga Națională, the top-tier league in Romania. The team represents the basketball men's section of CSM Târgu Mureș, a multi-sports club, founded in 2017 by the decision of the local council of Târgu Mureș, in order to reinvigorate the sport from the city, which was in crisis at that time.

Current roster

Depth chart

References

External links
 
 in romanian CSM Târgu Mureș at csmtgm.ro
 in hungarian CSM Târgu Mureș at csmtgm.ro
 CSM Târgu Mureș at totalbaschet.ro
 CSM Târgu Mureș at baschetromania.ro

2018 establishments in Romania
Basketball teams in Romania
Basketball teams established in 2018